Stigmastanol (sitostanol) is a phytosterol found in a variety of plant sources.  Similar to sterol esters and stanol esters, stigmastanol inhibits the absorption of cholesterol from the diet.  Animal studies suggest that it also inhibits biosynthesis of cholesterol in the liver.

Stigmastanol is the product of the reduction of β-sitosterol and the hydrogenation of stigmasterol.

See also 
 Stigmasterol, a closely related sterol

References 

Phytosterols